The 1999 Big 12 Conference softball tournament was held at ASA Hall of Fame Stadium in Oklahoma City, OK from May 12 through May 15, 1999. Texas won their first conference tournament and earned the Big 12 Conference's automatic bid to the 1999 NCAA Division I softball tournament. 

Standings
Source:

Schedule
Source:

All-Tournament Team
Source:

References

Big 12 Conference softball tournament
Tournament
Big 12 softball tournament